Rockpile or The Rockpile may refer to:

Rockpile, 1970s and early 1980s British rock and roll band 
Rockpile AVA, the American Viticultural Area
The Rockpile, the Vietnam War geographic location
Rockpile (album), an album by Dave Edmunds
War Memorial Stadium (Buffalo, New York), the American football stadium known as "The Rockpile"
A pile of rocks (sometimes known as a cairn)
"The Rockpile", local nickname for Mount Washington (New Hampshire)
The Rockpile (short story), a story by James Baldwin first published in 1965